Amblyseius wuyiensis is a species of mite in the family Phytoseiidae.

References

wuyiensis
Articles created by Qbugbot
Animals described in 1983